Pyunik is a town in the Kotayk Province of Armenia. It is part of the community of Artavaz village. Pyunik is a popular summer resort with several hotels and sports facilities.

Population 
According to Statistical Committee of Armenia, the village has a population of 316.

References

External links 

Populated places in Kotayk Province
Mountain resorts in Armenia